Zahn is a German and Ashkenazi Jewish surname. Notable persons with the surname include:

Albert Zahn, folk artist from Wisconsin, decorated the Albert Zahn House with carvings.
Anthony Zahn (born 1976), American cyclist
Ernst Zahn (1867–1952), Swiss writer
Friedrich Wilhelm Zahn (1845–1904), German pathologist
Geoff Zahn (born 1945), American baseball player
Gordon Zahn (1918–2007), American sociologist and pacifist
Helmut Zahn (1916–2004), German chemist
Joachim Zahn (1914–2002), German automotive executive
Johann Zahn (1641–1707), German canon who wrote on the camera obscura and who invented an early camera
Johannes Zahn (1817–1895), German musicologist and theologian who developed a taxonomy of Lutheran hymns and melodies
Karl Hermann Zahn (1865–1940), German botanist
Margaret A. Zahn, American sociologist and criminologist
Otto J. Zahn (1872–1965), American politician
Paula Zahn (born 1956), American newscaster
Peter von Zahn, (1913–2001), German author, filmmaker, and journalist
Robert Zahn (1861–1914), German engineer and industrialist
Steve Zahn (born 1967), American actor
Theodor Zahn (1838–1933), German biblical scholar
Timothy Zahn (born 1951), American science fiction novelist
Uwe Zahn (born 1965), German electronic artist
Wilhelm Zahn (1910–1976) German U-boat commander
Wilhelm Johann Karl Zahn (1800–1871), German architect, painter and art critic

See also

Lines of Zahn, a layered thrombus formed at the site of rapid blood flow
Zohn, a surname

German-language surnames
Jewish surnames
Surnames from nicknames